Fallbrook Union Elementary School District is a public school district based in San Diego County, California, United States.

References

External links
 

School districts in San Diego County, California